Pennington  may refer to:

Places

Australia
 Pennington, South Australia a suburb in Adelaide, Australia

South Africa
 Pennington, KwaZulu-Natal, South Africa

United Kingdom
 Pennington, Cumbria, village
 St Michael's Church, Pennington
 Pennington, Greater Manchester, a suburb of Greater Manchester
 Pennington Flash Country Park, a lake formed by mining subsidence frequented by birdwatchers
 Pennington railway station
 Pennington, Hampshire, a village in Hampshire, in the Parish of Lymington and Pennington, on the south coast of England
 Keyhaven, Pennington, Oxey and Normandy Marshes
 Lymington and Pennington, administrative area

United States
 New Pennington, Indiana, in Salt Creek Township, Decatur County
 Pennington, Alabama
 Pennington, Georgia
 Pennington, Minnesota, aka Cass River, a community in Beltrami County
 Pennington, New Jersey
 Home to The Pennington School
 Pennington, Texas
 Pennington, Wisconsin
 The Pennington Biomedical Research Center in Baton Rouge, Louisiana
 Pennington Cottage, a historic home in Maryland
 Pennington County, Minnesota
 Pennington County, South Dakota
 Pennington County Courthouse, in Rapid City
 Pennington Field, a stadium in Texas
 Pennington Formation, a geologic formation - Pennington Gap, Virginia
 Pennington Gap, Virginia, a town
 Pennington House (Clarksville, Arkansas)
 Pennington Lake, a lake in Minnesota
 Pennington/Prospect, Trenton, New Jersey, a neighborhood of Trenton
 Pennington Railroad Station, in Pennington, New Jersey
 Pennington Traditional School, a school in Manassas, Virginia
 Sarah Pennington House, a private house in Petoskey, Michigan
 S.A. Pennington House, in Jefferson Davis Parish, Louisiana

People 
see Pennington (surname)

Other 
 Patrick Pennington, fictional character in novel Pennington's Seventeenth Summer
 Pennington clamp
 Penningtons, a Canadian fashion store
 Pennington v Waine, an English trusts law case (2002)

See also
 Penington, surname